This is a list of number one singles on the Billboard Brazil Hot 100 chart in 2009. Note that Billboard publishes a monthly chart. The first number-one single on the chart was "Halo" by Beyoncé.

Chart history

See also
Billboard Brasil
List of number-one pop hits of 2009 (Brazil)

References 

Brazil Hot 100
2009